Agreement is a 1980 Bollywood drama film directed by Anil Ganguly and produced by Joginder Singh. The film starred Rekha and Shailendra Singh in leading roles.

Cast
 Rekha as Mala Mathur 
 Utpal Dutt as Mr. Mathur
 Shailendra Singh as Shekhar Sinha 
 Asrani as Dilip Kanuchand 
 Aruna Irani as Chanda 
 Sujit Kumar as Deepak 
 Bindu as Rinki 
 Nandita Thakur as Shanta
 Dinesh Hingoo
 Viju Khote
 Piloo J. Wadia
 Farita Boyce
 Master Sandeep
 Taneja
 Prem Kumar

Plot 
The understanding is an engaging satire film with Rekha, Utpal Dutta, and Shailendra Singh in the essential jobs. It is a quick-moving film with a ton of occasions circumventing the lives of Mala Mathur( Rekha ) and Shekhar ( Shailendra Singh ). Mala is remotely taught, achieved, and holds an advanced perspective on ladies' job in marriage and difficulties older uncle Mr. Mathur ( Utpal Dutta ) to demonstrate her point. The fact of the matter was that she will choose a spouse who will resemble a hireling and cook to her and she will discover a lot of contenders to take this activity. Executive Anil Ganguly made an excellent showing in making the silly conditions encompassing the provisions of the understanding marked by Mala and Shekhar. In the long run, both Mala and Shekhar build up a sentimental relationship and things end up true to form. The whole film is about Rekha who shown her acting abilities very well particularly as an outside prepared present-day lady wearing western dresses and haircuts. It is difficult to envision that the equivalent Rekha assumed the interminable job of prostitute Umrao Jaan. She is only a magnificent entertainer. The film will keep you stuck to the occasions and it is unquestionably a performer.

Soundtrack
 "Aapne Pyar Diya" - Shailendra Singh
 "Jane Kyon Mujhe" - Lata Mangeshkar
 "Jeena Bhi Koi Jeena Hai" - Shailendra Singh
 "Suno Suno Baat Pate Ki" - Lata Mangeshkar

Reception

References

External links 
 

Films scored by Bappi Lahiri
1980 films
1980s Hindi-language films
Indian drama films